The Music of Lennon & McCartney is a 1965 British television special honouring the Lennon–McCartney songwriting partnership of John Lennon and Paul McCartney of the English rock band the Beatles. It was produced by Granada Television and aired on that network on 16 December 1965 before receiving a national broadcast the following evening. The programme mainly consisted of other artists miming to their recordings of Lennon–McCartney songs, interspersed with scripted commentary from Lennon and McCartney. In addition, the Beatles performed both sides of their current single, "Day Tripper" and "We Can Work It Out". Peter Sellers performed a comedic interpretation of "A Hard Day's Night", in the style of stage actor Laurence Olivier's portrayal of Richard III.

The special served as further recognition for the Beatles, particularly Lennon and McCartney, outside the usual parameters of pop music. It followed the band members being presented with their MBEs in late October 1965 and led to a surge in the number of cover versions of Lennon–McCartney songs. The special was not shown again until December 1985, when it aired as part of Channel 4's celebration of 30 years of Granada Television.

Background and filming
The Music of Lennon & McCartney was a project initiated by Johnnie Hamp, who had championed the Beatles on Granada Television in 1962, a year before the band achieved national fame. Hamp intended the 1965 special to be a tribute to the Lennon–McCartney songwriting partnership. Negotiations to ensure the Beatles' participation were held for two months. The format was a variety special. Paul McCartney later said that the show "wasn't really our thing", and that he and John Lennon only agreed to participate out of loyalty towards Hamp. While the band committed to the Granada project, they turned down an invitation to perform at the Royal Variety Show and refused to reprise the Beatles Christmas Shows they had held over the 1963–64 and 1964–65 holiday seasons.

Filming took place at Granada's studios in Manchester on 1–2 November 1965. The Beatles interrupted the recording sessions for their album Rubber Soul, which they were under pressure to complete for a pre-Christmas release, in order to appear on the programme. Lennon and McCartney's contributions included delivering the scripted links between other artists' performances of their songs. George Harrison and Ringo Starr joined their bandmates to film mimed performances of both sides of the Beatles' forthcoming single, "Day Tripper" and "We Can Work It Out". The set design featured scaffolding around the walls, and steps and ladders. The harmonium played by Lennon during "We Can Work It Out" was the same instrument seen in Granada's popular soap opera Coronation Street. The Pamela Devis Dancers provided the choreography for some of the musical segments.

Peter Sellers filmed his contribution in advance at a studio in London, due to his other film commitments. The Beatles admired R&B singer Esther Phillips and had her flown over from America to give her first performances in the UK.

Programme content
All information per John Winn's book Way Beyond Compare: The Beatles' Recorded Legacy, Volume One, 1962–1965, unless otherwise noted.

Part 1
 The George Martin Orchestra, medley including "I Feel Fine" – ends with a cut to Lennon and McCartney playing a cymbal with drumsticks
 Peter and Gordon, "A World Without Love" – introduced by Lennon and McCartney after the pair have listened to some cover versions of their songs played on set props such as a Victrola, a reel-to-reel tape machine, and a transistor radio
 Lulu, "I Saw Him Standing There"
 Alan Haven and Tony Crombie, "A Hard Day's Night"
 Fritz Spiegl's Barock and Roll Ensemble, medley including "She Loves You" – introduced by Lennon and McCartney; the ensemble members wear Baroque-era costumes and powdered wigs, and are surrounded by a crowd of women dressed in contemporary Mod fashions
 The Beatles, "Day Tripper" – accompanied by a group of go-go dancers

Part 2
 Paul McCartney/Marianne Faithfull, "Yesterday" – starts with McCartney miming to the Beatles' 1965 track and cuts abruptly, at the start of the second verse, to Faithfull miming to her recent recording, which she sings in a different key
 Antonio Vargas, "She Loves You" – preceded by Lennon and McCartney walking around the set while they discuss foreign-language interpretations of their songs
 Dick Rivers, "Ces Mots Qu'on Oublie un Jour (Things We Said Today)"
 Billy J. Kramer & the Dakotas, "Bad to Me"
 Cilla Black, "It's for You"

Part 3
 The George Martin Orchestra, "Ringo's Theme (This Boy)" – accompanied by a group of go-go dancers
 Henry Mancini, "If I Fell – introduced by McCartney
 Esther Phillips, "And I Love Him" – introduced by Lennon
 Peter Sellers, "A Hard Day's Night"
 The Beatles, "We Can Work It Out"

Broadcast

Melody Maker announced the TV special, along with the imminent release of "Day Tripper" / "We Can Work It Out" and Rubber Soul, and the dates for the band's 1965 UK tour, on the front page of its 4 December issue. The special aired on the Granada network in the north of England between 9.40 and 10.35 pm on 16 December, and then received a nationwide broadcast on ITV on 17 December. It was the only television appearance the Beatles made in conjunction with the release of their new music, as promotional films for "Day Tripper" and "We Can Work It Out" were used to promote the single on Top of the Pops and other TV shows. The Music of Lennon & McCartney inspired the band's decision to make these clips, which served as forerunners to music videos becoming the standard means of promoting pop singles.

At the time, Lennon said of his and McCartney's songs: "There are only about a hundred people in the world who really understand what our music is all about. Ringo, George, and a few others scattered around the globe... The reason so many people use our numbers and add nothing at all to them is that they do not understand the music. Consequently they make a mess of it."

The recognition afforded the Lennon–McCartney partnership followed BBC Radio's Songwriters programme on the pair's achievements, while Mike Hennessey, writing in the same issue of Melody Maker, said the Beatles were "a pop music phenomenon which may very well never recur on such a monumental scale", adding: "But unquestionably the biggest single factor in their unprecedented success is the superb songwriting partnership of John Lennon and Paul McCartney." In his book 1965: The Making of Modern Britain, Christopher Bray writes that such was the band's ascendancy that year, the Beatles were "everywhere", as not only leaders of a "new aristocracy" but also recipients of MBEs. The latter was an unprecedented appointment for pop stars at the time and a reflection of British politicians' recognition of the Beatles' influence and mass appeal. Combined with the critical and public acclaim given to Rubber Soul, the show resulted in a surge in cover recordings of works from the Beatles' Northern Songs publishing catalogue. In author Bob Spitz's description: "By mid-1966, an astounding eighty-eight Lennon–McCartney songs had been recorded in over 2,900 versions. Gershwin finally had competition."

Availability
The Music of Lennon & McCartney was not aired again until 30 December 1985. It was shown on Channel 4 as part of an evening of programmes recognising 30 years of Granada Television. Due to this broadcast, the programme began circulating among bootleg collectors for the first time. The "Day Tripper" segment was included in the Beatles 1+ CD and DVD set, released in November 2015.

Among Beatles biographers, John Winn describes the Granada special as a "semisuccessful attempt to spotlight John and Paul's songwriting abilities". He says that the pair's "scripted banter is delivered awkwardly" and "neither are comfortable with the whole idea of the show, let alone the corny manner in which they are participating." Hunter Davies similarly finds Lennon and McCartney's spoken contributions "corny", although he gives the programme a score of seven out of ten with the assessment: "Great tribute show, with two fine Beatles performances as well." Rolling Stone critic Rob Sheffield recognises Sellers' segment as an "offbeat highlight" in which the comedian renders "the lyrics as a Shakesperean monologue... making them sound even filthier".

Notes

References

1965 television specials
Documentary films about the Beatles
Television programmes about the Beatles